Kriti Malhotra is a Bollywood actress and costume designer, who appeared in Dhobi Ghat.

Early life
Kriti Malhotra has graduated from Nowrosjee Wadia College, Pune in 2003 with a major in Geography, and also did a diploma in Fashion Apparel design.

Career
Appeared in Roadies Season 1. 

She has also worked in Peddlers which is a Hindi crime thriller directed by Vasan Bala. Kriti Malhotra has also worked as an assistant costume designer for many Hindi movies like Sarkar Raj, Delhi 6, Action Replay etc. Kriti has also designed for some of the TV Ads and promos.

Filmography

See also
List of Indian film actresses

References

 Cinebasti Biography: https://web.archive.org/web/20130821010742/http://www.cinebasti.com/celebrity/Kriti-Malhotra/9675

External links
 

Living people
Actresses in Hindi cinema
Indian costume designers
Year of birth missing (living people)